Bernice Vere (1 July 1900 – 13 March 1972) was an English-born stage, playwright, director, and film actress. She emigrated to Australia when she turned 12. She started performing on stage in Australia until the movie-producing team of E.J. Carroll and Snowy Baker discovered her. They cast her in the silent feature The Shadow of Lightning Ridge, where she acted alongside American actress Agnes Vernon.

Vere immigrated to the United States and married a prominent American writer while continuing her career as a stock actor. Her last motion picture was the silent feature  released in 1928. After her last film, she returned to the stage. She continued acting with several repertoire companies in the United States, developing into a playwright and Director. She died in New Jersey in 1972.

Early years
Vere was the second child born to John W. and Francis A. Vert of Formby, England. An older sister,  Adrienne Elizabeth, had previously arrived in July 1895. The 1901 English census lists her father's occupation as a Commercial Traveler (salesperson) and her mother as a stay-at-home parent. In 1911, the 12 year old attended a private girls' school in Sales, England.

Vere demonstrated a talent for singing and musicianship at an early age.  Bernice was a gifted violinist, and when she was 6, she became the 

In June 1912, Bernice Vert's family, minus her father, emigrated to Australia. The booking was a third-class contract (the only type of ticket available on the ship) and arrived in Sydney on June 19, 1912. The ship's manifest lists her mother, Francis (48), her sister Adrienne (18), and 11-year-old Bernice. Soon after her arrival, Bernice got involved in Australia's theater scene, acting in plays and performed as a child on stage.

Career

Stage

Her first appearance in an Australian newspaper was in the Freeman's Journal on June 25, 1914. The item mentioned Bernice Vert contributing a recitation to the St Patrick's Old Boys concert. She had just turned 14. When Bernice was 15, the media mentioned her performance at the Casula camp. When Bernice Vert was 16, the news media called her a "talented amateur."

By age 17, she was getting rave reviews for her performance in the comedy  —  . The newspaper reviewer states:

July 1919 would see performances in

Film
The ship SS Ventura sailed from San Francisco and arrived in Sydney on September 2, 1919. The ship carried four talented movie personalities recruited by Snowy Baker and approved by  E. J. Carroll. Their mission was simple:  They went to work immediately, starting with research and determining locations to shoot films.
 
The fruits of their collaboration resulted in a trio of films. The first film was The Man from Kangaroo, released in Australia on January 24, 1920. The film featured Snowy Baker, directed by Wilfred Lucas and written by Bess Meredyth. This is the only movie of the Lucas trio to survive and is available on YouTube.

The Shadow of Lighting Ridge

The second film of the American troupe was The Shadow of Lightning Ridge released in Australia on April 3, 1920. The feature starred Snowy Baker, was directed by Wilfred Lucas, and written by Bess Meredyth. The film was well received in Australia and successful at the box office.

The Australian media claimed Wilfred Lucas had trouble finding a suitable actress to play the part of  They claimed he even held up production until they found the right candidate. Then —  Being cast for the character of  provided the vehicle for Bernice Vert's first appearance in the film. 
Bernice Vert also chose a new film moniker: Bernice Vere. The Australian Leader reported,  Bernice would continue to use that cognomen whenever she appeared in Australian movies. She reverted to using her real name, Bernice Vert, in the 1928 American production of 

In the May 16, 1920, issue of Sunday Times, the reviewer observed:
A reviewer for the April 15, 1920, issue of The Bulletin wrote:

Since Bernice was an experienced stage actress, her acting impressed the right people. They immediately signed her to a 12-month contract.

The Jackeroo of Coolabong
The American troupe's third and final film was The Jackeroo of Coolabong, released in Australia on October 16, 1920. The feature starred Snowy Baker, was directed by Wilfred Lucas, and written by Bess Meredyth. The film featured Snowy Baker as Brian O'Farrell, Kathleen Key as Edith MacDonald, Wilfred Lucas as John MacDonald and Bernice Vere as The Moll. Lucas also added Bert Glennon as a co-director and  Dudley Blanchard as a film editor. None of these additions were native Australians. The film was well received in Australia and successful at the box office. 
The film was recut and released in the US as The Fighting Breed.

In the June 18, 1920 issue of the Australian newspaper Leader, the reviewer wrote:

Men were anxiously waiting at the dock when  The article in The Leader describes the arrival of 17-year-old Kathleen Key. After walking down the platform, she delivered a few words, then handed her soapbox to Wilfred Lucas. The Director explained  This statement offers a partial explanation of why Bernice Vere and other Australian celebrities were passed over for ingenue leads. On another note, her blond locks were concealed or didn't exist, as evidenced by the still shot on-site during the filming

During filming, E. J. Carroll clashed with Wilfred Lucas over alleged excessive expenses. This clash led to the termination of Lucas and Meredyth. They returned to America, arriving in San Francisco, California, on April 5, 1920.

The Library of Congress website claims a complete 16mm copy exists of The Fighting Breed stating, "Holdings: collector; Completeness: complete."

The Betrayer

Riding the success of The Man from Snowy River, Beaumont Smith 's now turned his attention to his next drama,  The Betrayer.
The Betrayer was released in Australia on March 19, 1921. The movie was written, produced, and directed by Beaumont Smith. The film featured Stella Southern as Iwa, Cyril Mackay as Stephen Manners, John Cosgrove as John Barris, and Bernice Vere playing John Barris's wife, Eleanor Barris. Snowy Baker did not act in this film because he had sought his fortunes in America. There are no published reviews of any actor's performance. The film was well received by critics and audiences alike.

A reviewer for the May 18, 1921, issue of The Register wrote:

A reviewer for the May 31, 1921, issue of Sunday Times wrote:

The Blue Mountains Mystery
The Blue Mountains Mystery was released in Australia on November 5, 1921. The film was based on Harrison Owen's novel The Mount Marunga Mystery. The movie was written by Raymond Longford and Lottie Lyell, then directed by the same team. The film featured  as Mrs. Tracey, John Faulkner as Henry Tracey, Vivian Edwards as Hector Blunt, and Bernice Vere as Pauline Tracey. Most reviews of actors in this movie seemed to focus on Marjorie Osborne (aka Mrs. Henry Hill Osborne).

A reviewer for the November 10, 1921, issue of the newspaper THE BULLETIN wrote:

A reviewer for the December 10, 1921, issue of the magazine TRIAD wrote:

This film would become Bernice Vere's last movie appearance in Australia film. An opportunity arose, and the 21-year-old traveled to Honolulu with old family friends, the Heifetz family. (The family of famous violinist Jascha Heifetz.) She departed for San Francisco, arriving on November 2, 1921. Bernice would now seek her fame and fortune in American movies. She would never return to Australia.

1922–1956
In February 1922, the Australian media showed Bernice was in Los Angeles    American media references the production of some “Biblical Pictures” but there is no mention of a film titled  A review of the Catalog of Copyright Entries discovered no records.

The following year, Australian media mentioned Bernice was  The Bulletin article further stated,  George Melford directed  Burning Sands, which starred Gloria Swanson and was released in September 1922 by Famous Players-Lasky Corporation. However, a thorough search of the media finds no credited role for Bernice Vere or Bernice Vert.

A Billboard article published in September, claimed  The Green Temptation starred Betty Compson, produced by Famous Players-Lasky and released in April 1922. The media search revealed no credited role for Bernice Vere or Bernice Vert in this film. A media search likewise discovered no credited role in  My American Wife starring Gloria Swanson produced by Famous Players-Lasky and released in December 1922.

An article published in the February 1924 issue of the Australian magazine The Bulletin stated   The October 16, 1924, issue of the Los Angeles Times pointed out 

In 1928, Bernice Vert acted in her last movie –  Bernard McEveety directed the film, which starred George Walsh, Marguerite Clayton, and released in May 1928. Bernice Vert had a credited role as   After her appearance in this movie, Bernice Vert would return to the stage, especially if the part called for a woman with an English or Irish accent.

A new play opened in August 1938, written by Aimee Torriani and Bernice Vert with songs by Songs by Paine Fenimore. Bernice missed opening night because she was still acting in "Night Must Fall" at the Community Playhouse in Spring Lake, New Jersey.

Between October 11 and October 12, 1940, Bernice Vert appeared in the Broadway play . The setting was Boyd's Shop in Donaghreagh, an Ulster Village in Northern Ireland. She played  The play lasted for three performances at the Booth Theatre at 222 W. 45th St., New York, NY.

The Courier News of Bridgewater, New Jersey, in an article published in 1947, that  The article also pointed out the performance of Mrs. Tait's play  in Hollywood.

A new Spanish-American musical debuted in July 1956 - . Aimee Torriani and Bernice Vert penned the show's book with songs created by Paine Fenimore. Her stage appearances had ceased gathering national or local media coverage. Bernice would continue to coach acting and other local projects until her death.

Marriage

When Bernice was 27, she married 29-year-old novelist James Warner Bellah Jr.  It was Bernice's first marriage and Bellah's second. The marriage ceremony occurred on Saturday, May 12, 1928, in Fulham, England. Documentation supports this English marriage and is consistent with James Bellah's world travels. The name on the English marriage document is Bernice E Vert.

The 1930 census states the couple were living in Easton, Maryland. They would have one son, born in 1931. James Bellah II would inherit his father's propensity for writing and soldiering.

Starting in 1928, James Bellah completed six novels while married to Bernice, including  in 1932. The novel was the basis of the Musical Dancing Lady starring Joan Crawford And Clark Gable. The movie was directed by Robert Z. Leonard and released on November 24, 1933.
Two years after their son was born, James and Bernice were divorced and Bellah had married Gruzilla Taylor Deshon on May 1, 1933.

In August 1935, Bernice Bellah departed New York bound for London, arriving on August 18, 1935. She was alone but claimed she was married on the manifest.

In February 1936, Bernice Bellah returned to America, arriving in New York on February 28, 1936. The manifest lists her as 36, married to James W Bellah, and living in Fairfield. Her father died in March 1936.

Bernice Vert's second and final marriage was to Andrew Tait, performed in 1942. The couple settled in Plainfield, New Jersey. She would remain in New Jersey until her death in 1972.

Deaths
Bernice Tait (Vert) died on March 13, 1972, in Westfield, New Jersey. She was 71 when she died.

Her sister, Adrienne Elizabeth, died in South Wales, Australia, on March 4, 1970. She was 74 when she died.

Her first husband, James Warner Bellah, would die of a heart attack in Los Angeles, California, on September 22, 1976. He was 77 when he died.

Her second husband, Andrew Tait, would die of injuries from an auto accident on March 15, 1977. He was 71 he died.

Bernice's youngest son from her marriage to Bellah, James Bellah II, would die in December 2015. He had followed in his famous father's footsteps, becoming an "educator, actor, author, and veteran." He was 84 years old when he died.

Myths

Many of Bernice Vere's movie credits were changed to Brownie Vernon in various movie databases. These are the facts:

Agnes "Brownie" Vernon acted in 3 Australian movies. The trio of films was released between 1920 and 1921:
The Man from Kangaroo - produced by the Baker-Meredyth-Lucas consortium, was released on January 24, 1920. Brownie Vernon played Muriel Hammond.
Brownie Vernon played "Dorothy Harden," and Bernice Vere played "Portuguese Annie,"   After completing The Shadow of Lightning Ridge, Agnes Vernon left Australia and headed back to California in May 1920.
Silks and Saddles - produced by Commonwealth Pictures, directed by Brownie's husband John K. Wells, and released on March 5, 1921. Brownie Vernon played Bobbie Morton. Vernon had returned to Australia to make this film and spent the remainder of 1921 in Australia while her husband pursued business opportunities. Vernon's time in Australia during 1921 is the primary source of the Agnes Vernon/Bernice Vere controversy. Brownie and her husband sailed for California in March 1922.
 
Bernice Vere made four movies in Australia before heading to Hollywood in November 1921.
The Shadow of Lightning Ridge was released on April 3, 1920. The newspaper ads credit both Brownie Vernon and Bernice Vere. All newspaper ads for the movie, giving credit to both actresses, should have ended this controversy.
The Jackeroo of Coolabong  was the last movie produced by the Baker-Meredyth-Lucas consortium and released on October 16, 1920.  is the repackaged version of this movie made for US audiences and released on September 1, 1921. IMDb listing for The Jackeroo of Coolabong credits Bernice Vere as "the Moll." The American Film Institute gives no credit to Bernice Vere but lists Agnes Vernon in the cast. The AFI site also displays this qualifier  The  IMDb  listing for  mentioned neither actress. Bernice did receive a review from the Australian media for her performance in this film. 
The Betrayer was released on March 19, 1921, and directed by  Beaumont Smith. Bernice Vere played Eleanor Barris. IMDb credits Agnes Vernon playing Eleanor Barris. The Australian media notes - In the March–April timeframe of 1921, Beaumont Smith took  The article also published a list of the actors, which included Bernice Vere, and emphasized that Beaumont Smith only used Australian actors for this film.
The Blue Mountains Mystery was released on November 5, 1921. Bernice Vere played Pauline Tracey. Silent Era credits "Bernice Vere (Agnes Vernon)" as playing the part of Pauline Tracey. IMDb credits  The Australian media provided two reviews for Bernice Vere as shown above validating her part in the movie. According to an advertisement in the Motion Picture News, the movie featured John Faulkner, and  The AFI record of the film shows Bernice Ware playing Pauline Tracey. None of Bernice Vere's silent movies survive. 

Another myth —   
There is a reference (Australian and American media) alluding to Bernice Vert being in Germany when World War I started. The Great War began on July 28, 1914. Bernice had just turned 14. There are no supporting references for placing her in Germany when war broke out. The sole documentation available shows that in 1912, 11-year-old Bernice Vert emigrated from England to Australia.

Filmography
This list is the selected filmography of Bernice Estelle Vert  Bernice Vere. All films highlighted in green are films recut from the original Australian version to better play in the United States. Most of the films on this list are considered  lost.

References

Further reading

External links

"The Shadow of Lightning Ridge" at SilentEra

The Jackeroo of Coolabong at SilentEra

The Fighting Breed / Wilfred Lucas [motion picture at Library of Congress

The Betrayer at National Film and Sound Archive 

1900 births
1972 deaths
English silent film actresses
Australian film actresses
Australian silent film actresses
English emigrants to Australia
English emigrants to the United States
People from Formby